Sotonosawa Dam is an earthfill dam located in Akita Prefecture in Japan. The dam is used for irrigation. The catchment area of the dam is 1 km2. The dam impounds about 8  ha of land when full and can store 410 thousand cubic meters of water. The construction of the dam was started on 1940 and completed in 1952.

References

Dams in Akita Prefecture
1952 establishments in Japan